The Hale may refer to:

The Hale, Barnet, London, England
The Hale, Buckinghamshire, Wendover, Buckinghamshire, England

See also
Hale (disambiguation)
Hale Telescope